The 46th National Film Awards, presented by Directorate of Film Festivals, the organisation set up by Ministry of Information and Broadcasting, India to felicitate the best of Indian Cinema released in the year 1998. Ceremony took place on 15 February 2000 and awards were given by then President of India, K. R. Narayanan.

Awards 

Awards were divided into feature films, non-feature films and books written on Indian cinema.

Lifetime Achievement Award

Feature films 

Feature films were awarded at All India as well as regional level. For 46th National Film Awards, a Hindi film, Samar won the National Film Award for Best Feature Film, whereas another Hindi film, Godmother won the maximum number of awards (6). Following were the awards given in each category:

Juries 

A committee headed by D. V. S. Raju was appointed to evaluate the feature films awards. Following were the jury members:

 Jury Members
 D. V. S. Raju (Chairperson)Mirnmoy ChakrabortyNachiket PatwardhanAruna VasudevRamesh SippyB. Narsing RaoSuresh HeblikarRanjan BoseBhawana SomaayaChitraarthGautam BoraSumitra BhaveBhaskar ChandavarkarVennira Aadai NirmalaBalachandra MenonJ. L. RalhanAli Peter John

All India Award 

Following were the awards given:

Golden Lotus Award 

Official Name: Swarna Kamal

All the awardees are awarded with 'Golden Lotus Award (Swarna Kamal)', a certificate and cash prize.

Silver Lotus Award 

Official Name: Rajat Kamal

All the awardees are awarded with 'Silver Lotus Award (Rajat Kamal)', a certificate and cash prize.

Regional Awards 

The award is given to best film in the regional languages in India.

Best Feature Film in Each of the Language Other Than Those Specified in the Schedule VIII of the Constitution

Non-Feature Films 

Short Films made in any Indian language and certified by the Central Board of Film Certification as a documentary/newsreel/fiction are eligible for non-feature film section.

Juries 

A committee headed by Shaji N. Karun was appointed to evaluate the non-feature films awards. Following were the jury members:

 Jury Members
 Shaji N. Karun (Chairperson)Rajesh ParmarNandan KudhyadiSehjo SinghShoma A. Chatterjee

Golden Lotus Award 

Official Name: Swarna Kamal

All the awardees are awarded with 'Golden Lotus Award (Swarna Kamal)', a certificate and cash prize.

Silver Lotus Award 

Official Name: Rajat Kamal

All the awardees are awarded with 'Silver Lotus Award (Rajat Kamal)' and cash prize.

{|class="wikitable" style="width:100%;"
|-
!style="background-color:#EFE4B0;width:24%;"|Name of Award
!style="background-color:#EFE4B0;width:20%;"|Name of Film
!style="background-color:#EFE4B0;width:10%;"|Language
!style="background-color:#EFE4B0;width:30%;"|Awardee(s)
!style="background-color:#EFE4B0;width:16%;"|Cash Prize
|- style="background-color:#F4F4F4"
|rowspan="2"|Best First Non-Feature Film
|Repentance
|Malayalam
|Producer: Mohan Agashe  Films DivisionDirector: Rajeev Raj
| 10,000/- Each
|- style="background-color:#F9F9F9"
|colspan="4"|Citation: For exploring new forms of cinematic expression and images.
|- style="background-color:#F4F4F4"
|rowspan="2"|Best Anthropological / Ethnographic Film
|Kherwal Parab
|Santali
|Producer: Sankar RakshitDirector: Sankar Rakshit
| 10,000/- Each
|- style="background-color:#F9F9F9"
|colspan="4"|Citation: For offering an insider's view into Santhal rites and rituals with authenticity and honesty.
|- style="background-color:#F4F4F4"
|rowspan="2"|Best Biographical Film
|Premji' – Ithihasathinte SparsamUnarvinte Kalam – M.R.B.|Malayalam
|Producer: Kerala Sangeetha Nataka AkademiDirector: M. R. Rajan
| 10,000/- Each
|- style="background-color:#F9F9F9"
|colspan="4"|Citation: For an insightful voyage into the meaningful and exemplary lives of Premji and M.R.B., two legendary social reformers.|- style="background-color:#F4F4F4"
|rowspan="2"|Best Arts / Cultural Film
|A Painter of Eloquent Silence: Ganesh Pyne|English
|Producer: Buddhadeb DasguptaDirector: Buddhadeb Dasgupta
| 10,000/- Each
|- style="background-color:#F9F9F9"
|colspan="4"|Citation: For a moving tribute from one artist to another and an appreciation of a painter's hidden expression.|- style="background-color:#F4F4F4"
|rowspan="2"|Best Environment / Conservation / Preservation Film
|Willing To Sacrifice|English
|Producer: Dayakar RaoDirector: B. V. Rao
| 10,000/- Each
|- style="background-color:#F9F9F9"
|colspan="4"|Citation: For an honest portrayal of the sacred convictions of a people for whom conservation is a way of life.|- style="background-color:#F4F4F4"
|rowspan="2"|Best Historical Reconstruction / Compilation Film
|Anna Vaazhigirar|Tamil
|Producer: Tamil Nadu Films DivisionDirector: Tamil Nadu Films Division
| 10,000/- Each
|- style="background-color:#F9F9F9"
|colspan="4"|Citation: For integrating various cinematic forms to present a strong portrait of Annadurai.|- style="background-color:#F4F4F4"
|rowspan="2"|Best Film on Social Issues
|Malli|Tamil
|Producer: Film and TV Institute of Tamil NaduDirector: R. Madhava Krisshnan
| 10,000/- Each
|- style="background-color:#F9F9F9"
|colspan="4"|Citation: For its original reflection on the subject of sex-workers.|- style="background-color:#F4F4F4"
|rowspan="2"|Best Educational / Motivational / Instructional Film
|Silent Scream|English
|Producer: Vivek K. KumarDirector: Vikram K. Kumar
| 10,000/- Each
|- style="background-color:#F9F9F9"
|colspan="4"|Citation: For its daring attempt to shake people out of their apathy towards youth in distress.|- style="background-color:#F4F4F4"
|rowspan="2"|Best Exploration / Adventure Film
|Malana – In Search Of|English
|Producer: Neo FilmsDirector: Vivek Mohan
| 10,000/- Each
|- style="background-color:#F9F9F9"
|colspan="4"|Citation: For its in-depth and detailed unearthing of a people isolated in time.|- style="background-color:#F4F4F4"
|rowspan="2"|Best Investigative Film
|Saga of Darkness|Bengali
|Producer: Creative ImageDirector: Gautam Sen
| 10,000/- Each
|- style="background-color:#F9F9F9"
|colspan="4"|Citation: For its courageous expose of an inhuman practice and state apathy.|- style="background-color:#F4F4F4"
|rowspan="2"|Best Animation Film
|Education Only Her Future|Only Music
|Producer: Arun Gongade  Films DivisionDirector: Arun Gongade  Films DivisionAnimator: Arun Gongade  Films Division
| 10,000/- Each
|- style="background-color:#F9F9F9"
|colspan="4"|Citation: For its imaginative use of technique to make a strong statement for the education of the girl-child.|- style="background-color:#F4F4F4"
|rowspan="2"|Best Short Fiction Film
|Jee Karta Tha|Hindi
|Producer: Mohan Agashe  Films DivisionDirector: Hansa Thapliyal
| 10,000/- Each
|- style="background-color:#F9F9F9"
|colspan="4"|Citation: For its brilliant originality in delineating a small town milieu and in evolving a new cinematic idiom.|- style="background-color:#F4F4F4"
|rowspan="2"|Best Film on Family Welfare
|N. M. No. 367 – Sentence of Silence|English
|Producer: Y. N. Engineer  Films DivisionDirector: Joshy Joseph  Films Division
| 10,000/- Each
|- style="background-color:#F9F9F9"
|colspan="4"|Citation: For its strong redefining of the family ethos in changing social circumstances of the Indian christian community.|- style="background-color:#F4F4F4"
|rowspan="2"|Best Cinematography
|In The Forest Hangs a Bridge|English
|Cameraman: Ranjan PalitLaboratory Processing: Prasad Film Laboratories
| 10,000/- Each
|- style="background-color:#F9F9F9"
|colspan="4"|Citation: For his perception of images to define a style that illustrates the harmony in the film.|- style="background-color:#F4F4F4"
|rowspan="2"|Best Audiography
|Kumar Talkies|Hindi
|Satheesh P. M.
| 10,000/-
|- style="background-color:#F9F9F9"
|colspan="4"|Citation: For a sound design which evokes a vision of an era fading away.|- style="background-color:#F4F4F4"
|rowspan="2"|Best Editing
|In The Forest Hangs a Bridge|English
|Reena Mohan
| 10,000/-
|- style="background-color:#F9F9F9"
|colspan="4"|Citation: For weaving a narrative imbued with lyricism of life.|- style="background-color:#F4F4F4"
|rowspan="2"|Best Music Direction
|A Painter of Eloquent Silence: Ganesh Pyne|English
|Biswadeb Dasgupta
| 10,000/-
|- style="background-color:#F9F9F9"
|colspan="4"|Citation: For enriching the visuals with a contemplative sense of rhythm.|- style="background-color:#F4F4F4"
|rowspan="2"|Special Jury Award
|Faqir|Hindi
|Pawan Malhotra (Actor)
| 10,000/-
|- style="background-color:#F9F9F9"
|colspan="4"|Citation: For superb restraint in portraying of Innocence, in Gautom Ghose's film Faqir.|- style="background-color:#F4F4F4"
|rowspan="4"|Special Mention
|Jee Karta Tha|Hindi
|Unni Vijayan (Director)
|Certificate Only
|- style="background-color:#F9F9F9"
|colspan="4"|Citation: For his realisation of an innovative and a personalised style of constructing the film.''
|}

 Best Writing on Cinema 

The awards aim at encouraging study and appreciation of cinema as an art form and dissemination of information and critical appreciation of this art-form through publication of books, articles, reviews etc.

 Juries 

A committee headed by M. T. Vasudevan Nair was appointed to evaluate the writing on Indian cinema. Following were the jury members:

 Jury Members'''
 M. T. Vasudevan Nair (Chairperson)Githa HariharanSanjit Narwekar

Golden Lotus Award 

Official Name: Swarna Kamal

All the awardees are awarded with 'Golden Lotus Award (Swarna Kamal)' and cash prize.

Special Mention 

All the award winners are awarded with Certificate of Merit.

Awards not given 

Following were the awards not given as no film was found to be suitable for the award:

 Best Feature Film in Manipuri
 Best Non-Feature Film Direction
 Best Scientific Film
 Best Promotional Film
 Best Agricultural Film

References

External links 
 National Film Awards Archives
 Official Page for Directorate of Film Festivals, India

National Film Awards (India) ceremonies
2000 Indian film awards